The Man Life Passed By is a 1923 American silent drama film directed by Victor Schertzinger and starring Percy Marmont, Jane Novak, and Eva Novak. The Novak sisters portray two sisters in the film.

Plot
As described in a film magazine review, John Turbin is robbed of his invention by 'Iron Man' Moore. His mother dies, and his only friend is Miss Hope who, unknown to Turbin, is one of Moore's daughters. Because of her influence, Turbin saves the other daughter Joy. Mr. Moore is so grateful that he does the right thing by Turbin and he accepts the love between Turbin and Hope.

Cast

Preservation
A complete print of The Man Life Passed By is held by Gosfilmofond.

References

Bibliography
 James Robert Parish & Michael R. Pitts. Film directors: a guide to their American films. Scarecrow Press, 1974.

External links

1923 films
1923 drama films
1920s English-language films
American silent feature films
Silent American drama films
Films directed by Victor Schertzinger
American black-and-white films
Metro Pictures films
1920s American films